Zúñiga is a Peruvian football club, playing in the city of Lima, Peru.

The club is the biggest of Lima city, and one of the biggest in Lima Province.

The club were founded 1981 and play in the Copa Perú which is the third division of the Peruvian league.

History
The club have played at the second level of Peruvian football on several occasions, from 1988 until 1998 Torneo Descentralizado, when was relegated to the Copa Perú.

The club has produced a limited number of players that have participated in the top flight although many have made their name in the Copa Perú.

Honours

National
Peruvian Segunda División:
Runner-up (2): 1991, 1995

Regional
Liga Distrital de La Molina:
Runner-up (1): 2017

See also
List of football clubs in Peru
Peruvian football league system

External links
 Historia del Deportivo Zúñiga

Football clubs in Peru
Association football clubs established in 1981
1981 establishments in Peru